Store Venjetinden (or sometimes Store Vengetinden) is a mountain in the municipality of Rauma in Møre og Romsdal county, Norway. It is the highest summit in the Romsdalsalpane range.

Ascents

The first ascent via the western ridge was in 1930 by Erik Heen and Karl Oshaug.

In 2021, the men's world record for the vertical kilometer was set by Spanish mountain runner Kílian Jornet at Vengetind with a time of 28:48.

See also
List of mountains of Norway

References

External links
 
 Pictures of the mountain

Mountains of Møre og Romsdal
Rauma, Norway